Ottawa County (standard abbreviation: OT) is a county located in the U.S. state of Kansas. As of the 2020 census, the county population was 5,735. The largest city and county seat is Minneapolis.

History

Early history

For many millennia, the Great Plains of North America was inhabited by nomadic Native Americans.  From the 16th century to 18th century, the Kingdom of France claimed ownership of large parts of North America.  In 1762, after the French and Indian War, France secretly ceded New France to Spain, per the Treaty of Fontainebleau.

19th century
In 1802, Spain returned most of the land to France, but keeping title to about 7,500 square miles.  In 1803, most of the land for modern day Kansas was acquired by the United States from France as part of the 828,000 square mile Louisiana Purchase for 2.83 cents per acre.

In 1854, the Kansas Territory was organized, then in 1861 Kansas became the 34th U.S. state.  In 1860, Ottawa County was established.

20th century
Following amendment to the Kansas Constitution in 1986, Ottawa County remained a prohibition, or dry county until 2006, when voters approved the sale of alcoholic liquor by the individual drink with a 30% food sales requirement.

Geography

Features
The Solomon River is the longest river in the county, entering from Cloud County to the northwest and exiting to Saline County to the southeast. The Saline River traverses the southwestern portion of the county, going from Lincoln County to Saline County.

The largest lake is Ottawa State Fishing Lake, a  reservoir to the east of Minneapolis. It is managed by the Kansas Department of Wildlife and Parks.

Adjacent counties
 Cloud County (north)
 Clay County (northeast)
 Dickinson County (southeast)
 Saline County (south)
 Lincoln County (west)
 Mitchell County (northwest)

Demographics

Ottawa County is part of the Salina, KS Micropolitan Statistical Area.

As of the census of 2000, there were 6,163 people, 2,430 households, and 1,718 families residing in the county.  The population density was 8 people per square mile (3/km2).  There were 2,755 housing units at an average density of 4 per square mile (1/km2).  The racial makeup of the county was 97.53% White, 0.54% Black or African American, 0.37% Native American, 0.13% Asian, 0.02% Pacific Islander, 0.32% from other races, and 1.09% from two or more races.  1.30% of the population were Hispanic or Latino of any race.

There were 2,430 households, out of which 31.60% had children under the age of 18 living with them, 61.40% were married couples living together, 6.30% had a female householder with no husband present, and 29.30% were non-families. 25.70% of all households were made up of individuals, and 13.40% had someone living alone who was 65 years of age or older.  The average household size was 2.46 and the average family size was 2.96.

In the county, the population was spread out, with 25.70% under the age of 18, 5.80% from 18 to 24, 26.70% from 25 to 44, 24.20% from 45 to 64, and 17.60% who were 65 years of age or older.  The median age was 40 years. For every 100 females, there were 99.90 males.  For every 100 females age 18 and over, there were 95.90 males.

The median income for a household in the county was $38,009, and the median income for a family was $46,033. Males had a median income of $30,761 versus $21,380 for females. The per capita income for the county was $17,663.  About 5.10% of families and 8.60% of the population were below the poverty line, including 8.80% of those under age 18 and 11.70% of those age 65 or over.

Government

Presidential elections

Like all of Kansas outside the eastern cities, Ottawa County is overwhelmingly Republican. No Democratic Presidential candidate has won Ottawa County since Lyndon Johnson in 1964, and the last to reach thirty percent of the county's vote was Michael Dukakis in 1988 during a major Great Plains drought.

Education

Unified school districts
 North Ottawa County USD 239
 Twin Valley USD 240

Communities

Cities
 Bennington
 Culver
 Delphos
 Minneapolis
 Tescott

Unincorporated communities
† means a Census-Designated Place (CDP) by the United States Census Bureau.
 Ada†
 Lindsey
 Niles†
 Sumnerville
 Verdi
 Wells†

Ghost town
 Vine Creek

Townships
Ottawa County is divided into twenty townships.  The city of Minneapolis is considered governmentally independent and is excluded from the census figures for the townships.  In the following table, the population center is the largest city (or cities) included in that township's population total, if it is of a significant size.

See also

References

Further reading

 Standard Atlas of Ottawa County, Kansas; Geo. A. Ogle & Co; 74 pages; 1918.
 Plat Book of Ottawa County, Kansas; North West Publishing Co; 43 pages; 1902.

External links

County
 
 Ottawa County - Directory of Public Officials
Maps
 Ottawa County Maps: Current, Historic, KDOT
 Kansas Highway Maps: Current, Historic, KDOT
 Kansas Railroad Maps: Current, 1996, 1915, KDOT and Kansas Historical Society

 
Kansas counties
Kansas placenames of Native American origin
1860 establishments in Kansas Territory
Salina, Kansas micropolitan area